The Oregon Intercollegiate Football Association (OIFA) was the pioneer governing committee which coordinated games of football between various colleges in the American state of Oregon. The committee agreed upon common rules of play, scheduled games, and provided a framework for an annual champion in the years 1893 and 1897.

Organizational history

1893 season

There were four teams participating in the OIFA in 1893. Oregon Agricultural College Aggies were crowned 'Champions'

The teams finished the 1893 season with the following records:

1894 season

There were seven teams participating in the OIFA in 1894. Portland University were crowned 'Champions.'

The teams finished the 1894 season with the following records:

1895 season

A meeting of college representatives was held in Salem on Saturday, October 5, 1895 to organize a schedule for the coming year. Attending were representatives of Portland University, Oregon Agricultural College, the University of Oregon, Pacific University, and new participant Willamette University. The 1894 season marked the first year of organized football for Willamette and the 1895 campaign would be their second. Oregon Normal School (today's Western Oregon State College) did not participate.

President E. E. Washburne of Portland University was selected as president of the conference by virtue of his school having won the championship in 1894. The conference representatives agreed to accept the Harvard–Pennsylvania–Cornell rules for the 1895–96 season  and adopted the Spalding No. J football as the official ball of the league. The University of Oregon Webfoots won their 1st football Conference/League Championship.

The teams finished the 1895 season with the following overall records:

1896 season

There were seven teams participating in the OIFA in 1896. Willamette University were crowned 'Champions.'

The teams finished the 1896 season with the following records:

1897 season

There were six teams participating in the OIFA in 1897. Oregon Agricultural College Aggies were crowned 'Champions.' They also went on the beat the Oregon Webfoots and Washington Sun-Dodgers and with those two wins, the team proclaimed themselves the "Champions of the Northwest".. 

The teams finished the 1897 season with the following records:

References

1895 college football season
1895 in sports in Oregon